Yuri Vasilievich Lebedev (born March 1, 1951) is a former Russian hockey player, who competed for the Soviet Union. He scored a hat trick against the Netherlands during the 1980 Winter Olympic games.

External links

1951 births
Living people
HC CSKA Moscow players
Ice hockey players at the 1980 Winter Olympics
Krylya Sovetov Moscow players
Olympic ice hockey players of the Soviet Union
Olympic silver medalists for the Soviet Union
Ice hockey people from Moscow
Soviet expatriate ice hockey players
Soviet ice hockey right wingers
Olympic medalists in ice hockey
Medalists at the 1980 Winter Olympics